Gompholobium confertum is a species of flowering plant in the family Fabaceae and is endemic to the south-west of Western Australia. This species was first formally described in 1825 by Augustin Pyramus de Candolle who gave it the name Burtonia conferta in Prodromus Systematis Naturalis Regni Vegetabilis. In 1987 Michael Douglas Crisp changed the name to Gompholobium confertum. The specific epithet (confertum) means "crowded", referring to the foliage.

Gompholobium confertum grows in sandy soil on undulating plains and in winter-west areas in the 
Avon Wheatbelt, Esperance Plains, Geraldton Sandplains, Jarrah Forest, Mallee, Swan Coastal Plain and Warren biogeographic regions of south-western Western Australia. It is classified as "not threatened" by the Government of Western Australia Department of Parks and Wildlife.

References

confertum
Eudicots of Western Australia
Plants described in 1825
Taxa named by Augustin Pyramus de Candolle